Mutaz Kailouni (born 10 March 1985 in Latakia, Syria) is a Syrian footballer. He currently plays for Al-Busaiteen which competes in Bahrain.

International career
Kailouni was a part of the Syrian U-19 national team that finished in Fourth place at the 2004 AFC U-19 Championship in Malaysia and he was a part of the Syrian U-20 national team at the 2005 FIFA U-20 World Cup in the Netherlands. He plays against Canada, Italy and Colombia in the group-stage of the FIFA U-20 World Cup and against Brazil in the Round of 16.

International goals
Scores and results table. Syria's goal tally first:

Honours

National team
AFC U-19 Championship 2004: Fourth place
FIFA U-20 World Cup 2005: Round of 16
Nehru Cup: 2009 Runner-up

References

External links

1985 births
Living people
People from Latakia
Association football midfielders
Syrian footballers
Syria international footballers
Tishreen SC players
Al-Ittihad Aleppo players
Al-Jaish Damascus players
Syrian expatriate footballers
Expatriate footballers in Jordan
Syrian expatriate sportspeople in Jordan
Expatriate footballers in Iran
Syrian expatriate sportspeople in Iran
Expatriate footballers in Iraq
Syrian expatriate sportspeople in Iraq
Expatriate footballers in Bahrain
Syrian expatriate sportspeople in Bahrain
Syrian Premier League players